Winding Wood is a hamlet and a wood in the West Berkshire district, in the English county of Berkshire. It is south of the M4 motorway and north of the larger hamlet of Clapton.

Hamlets in Berkshire
Kintbury